The 2022 Women's East Asia Cup was a Women's Twenty20 International (WT20I) cricket tournament held in Kaizuka, Osaka, Japan in October 2022. This was the fourth edition of the women's East Asia Cup, and was originally scheduled to involve the same teams as in all previous editions, namely China, Hong Kong, Japan and South Korea. China and South Korea both withdrew from this year's tournament, and so Japan and Hong Kong played a four-match series to determine the winner. The four member countries signed an agreement in 2021 to make the women's East Asia Cup an annual event, but the 2021 event (which would have been played in Hong Kong) was cancelled due to COVID-19. China won the previous tournament in 2019.

Hong Kong were comfortable winners by 8 wickets in the first game. The second game ended with the same result, with Hong Kong's Mariko Hill scoring an unbeaten 51. Hong Kong took an unassailable lead in the series by winning the third game, helped by an unbeaten 86 from Natasha Miles. An improved performance by the hosts saw Japan fall short by just 3 runs, with Akari Kano scoring an unbeaten half-century. The last match of the series ended in a tie, with Hong Kong winning in the Super Over to take the series 4–0.

Squads

WT20I series

1st WT20I

2nd WT20I

3rd WT20I

4th WT20I

Notes

References

External links
 Series home at ESPNcricinfo

Associate international cricket competitions in 2022–23
Twenty20 East Asia Cup
Hong Kong 2022-23
East Asia Cup